is a DVD release of Japanese boy band Arashi. It was released on April 16, 2008 by their record label J Storm. Summer Tour 2007 Final Time: Kotoba no Chikara documented Arashi's summer concert at Tokyo Dome in correspondence with their Time album.

History and highlights
The DVD was recorded at their Tokyo Dome concert on October 8, 2007. Footages of Arashi's "Fight Song" performance while bungee jumping for their concert at Yokohama Arena (July 13, 2007) were also included in Disc 2.

Contents

Disc 1
"Overture"

"Di-Li-Li"
"Kitto Daijoubu"
"Oh Yeah!"
"Friendship" (Masaki Aiba solo)
"Can't Let You Go" (Sho Sakurai solo)
"Jidai"
"Yes? No?"
"Carnival Night Part 2"
 (Kazunari Ninomiya solo)

"Wave"
"Love Situation"
"A Day in Our Life"
"Hadashi no Mirai"
"Hero"
"Yabai-Yabai-Yabai" (Jun Matsumoto solo)
"Song For Me" (Satoshi Ohno solo)
"Cry For You"
"Kotoba Yori Taisetsu na Mono"
"Kansha Kangeki Ame Arashi"
"Kimi no Tame ni Boku ga Iru"
"Pikanchi Double"
"Arashi"
"Sakura Sake"
"Be With You"
"Happiness"

Disc 2
Encore 1: "We Can Make It!", "Wish", "Love So Sweet"
Encore 2: "Future", "Rock You"
Encore 3: "Na! Na! Na!!", "Kansha Kangeki Ame Arashi"
MC (featuring Hey! Say! JUMP), Ura Arashi song:  
Special Feature: "Fight Song" at Yokohama Arena on July 31, 2007

Charts and certifications

Charts

Sales and certifications

Awards
The DVD was listed as one of the Music Videos Of The Year for the 23rd Japan Gold Disc Awards.

References

External links
 

Arashi video albums
2008 video albums
Live video albums
2008 live albums
J Storm video albums